William Henry Cogswell (December 3, 1798 – November 22, 1876) was an American physician.

Cogswell, the eldest child of Col. William and Mercy Cogswell, was born, December 3, 1798, in that part of Preston, Connecticut, which is now included in the town of Griswold. He was employed on his father's farm until he entered on the study of medicine at Yale Medical School, where he graduated in 1823.

Immediately upon receiving his degree he settled in Plainfield, Connecticut, at first in partnership with Dr. Josiah Fuller, but after two or three years he established a separate office and continued there, prominent and respected in the active practice of his profession, until his death, after two days' illness, November 22, 1876, aged 78 years. In 1830 he represented the town in the Connecticut Legislature, and in 1860 was a member of the Connecticut State Senate. For nearly three years during the American Civil War, he was a special agent, appointed by the Governor, to care for the sick and wounded soldiers of Connecticut regiments on the field or in the hospitals.

He was married, at about the time he began practice, to Mary L., daughter of Dr. Josiah Fuller. After her death he was again married, in 1829, to Lucretia A. Payne, of Canterbury, Connecticut, who survived him with five children.

External links
 

1798 births
1876 deaths
People from Griswold, Connecticut
Members of the Connecticut House of Representatives
Connecticut state senators
Physicians from Connecticut
Yale School of Medicine alumni
19th-century American politicians